Bihar, a state of India, currently has 38 administrative districts, 101 subdivisions (अनुमंडल) and 534 CD blocks.

A district of an Indian state is an administrative geographical unit, headed by a district magistrate or a deputy commissioner, an officer belonging to the Indian Administrative Service. The district magistrate or the deputy commissioner is assisted by a number of officials belonging to different wings of the administrative services of the state.

A superintendent of police, an officer belonging to Indian Police Service, is entrusted with the responsibility of maintaining law and order and related issues.

3 to 6 districts are comprised to form a division (प्रमंडल). Each district is divided into sub-divisions (अनुमंडल), which are further sub-divided into CD blocks (प्रखण्ड).

Summary

Detailed List

See also 

 India
 Bihar
 Government of Bihar
 Administration in Bihar
 Cities in Bihar
 Districts of Bihar
 Divisions of India
 Subdivisions of Bihar
 Blocks in Bihar
 Villages in Bihar

References 

Districts
B